Shahrizam Mohamed (born 27 March 1979 in Negeri Sembilan, Malaysia), is a professional footballer who plays as a defender for Terengganu FA.

Prior to this he played for Negeri Sembilan FA from 2000 to 2007. He is the team captain for Sarawak FA in 2007 before being replaced by Joseph Kalang Tie after his departure.

References

1979 births
Malaysian footballers
Living people
People from Negeri Sembilan
Association football defenders
Negeri Sembilan FA players